Rick Sheehy (born October 3, 1959) is an American politician who served as the 38th lieutenant governor of Nebraska from 2005 to 2013. A member of the Republican Party since 2003, he is the longest-serving lieutenant governor in Nebraska history, with slightly over eight years of service. He was appointed to the office by Governor Dave Heineman, having been previously elected as Mayor of Hastings in 2000.

Early life, education and private career
Sheehy was born in Hastings, Nebraska and graduated from St. Cecilia High School. He attended the University of Nebraska–Lincoln and later received certification as a paramedic from Central Community College in Hastings. Sheehy worked for Rural Metro Ambulance for more than 20 years, starting as an emergency medical technician and becoming Rural/Metro's paramedic field supervisor. In 1987, he became the market general manager, a position he held until his appointment as lieutenant governor.

In 1994, Sheehy was elected to the Hastings City Council as a Democrat. He served on the council for six years, for four of which (1996–2000), as president. He then served as Mayor of Hastings for four years. In 2003, he became a Republican.

Lieutenant governorship

In 2005, Governor Mike Johanns resigned to serve as U.S. Secretary of Agriculture under President George W. Bush. Lieutenant Governor Dave Heineman ascended to the governorship, and then appointed Sheehy to succeed him as lieutenant governor. Soon afterward, Heineman named Sheehy as his running mate in his bid for a full term in 2006. The Heineman-Sheehy ticket was handily elected in 2006 and was reelected in 2010.

Sheehy is past Chairman of the National Lieutenant Governors Association; he completed his term in July, 2012. He continued his work with the Association by serving on the executive committee. He also served on the Homeland Security Advisors Council for the National Governors Association.  As lieutenant governor, Sheehy was Director of Nebraska's Homeland Security Department. He is a past board member of the Nebraska Rural Health Association, as well as a FEMA Disaster Response Team member.
  
He was awarded the "Distinguished Service to the States" award by the Council of State Governments for his efforts as an advocate for Nebraska, and his work on computerized health records and emergency preparedness.

Resignation

The Omaha World-Herald reported that Sheehy, who was then married, had been using his state-issued cell phone for years to make 2,000 late-night telephone calls to four different women.

On February 2, 2013, Sheehy issued a two-sentence resignation letter. Later that day, Governor Dave Heineman held a press conference at the state capitol building to announce that he had accepted Sheehy's resignation. At the press conference, Heineman said, "We take our public trust very seriously. I had trusted him, and that trust was broken." Heineman's office subsequently released cell phone records corroborating the World-Heralds reporting. The records showed Sheehy had been making calls to women other than his wife for at least four years. He was replaced by Lavon Heidemann.

Personal life
Sheehy married Connie Sheehy in 1983. The couple had two children before divorcing in 2012.

See also
 List of American politicians who switched parties in office

References

External links

Sheehy Positioned to Begin Governor Bid

1959 births
Living people
University of Nebraska–Lincoln alumni
Lieutenant Governors of Nebraska
Nebraska city council members
Mayors of places in Nebraska
People from Hastings, Nebraska
Paramedics
Nebraska Republicans
Nebraska Democrats